Trinidadian and Tobagonian English (TE) or Trinidadian and Tobagonian Standard English is a dialect of English used in Trinidad and Tobago. TE co-exists with both non-standard varieties of English as well as other dialects, namely Trinidadian Creole in Trinidad and Tobagonian Creole in Tobago.

History
Trinidadian English was initially based on a standard of British English, including having a non-rhotic accent. In the Americas, TE now uses many Americanisms, including apartment and trunk (of a car). It is understandable by speakers of international standard English, although it uses a number of terms that are unique to it (perhaps coming from Trinidadian Creole), such as "to lime," meaning "to hang out." Speech in Trinidad (and, to some degree, in Tobago) may vary by location and circumstance and is often remarked for its "sing-song" (i.e., a rising and falling inflection) intonation. While this may be true, it is not fully clear what prosodic aspects results in this lay reaction from listeners, but it is suggested that both phonological and phonetic characteristics of Trinidadian English and Trinidadian Creole may play a role. Phonologically, Trinidadian English is said to have a high frequency of intonation such as phrase final rises in declarative utterances. Phonetically, the degree of pitch variation may also contribute to this "sing song" perception of the language variety.

See also
 Regional accents of English speakers

References

Sources
 Mendes, John (1986). Cote ce Cote la: Trinidad & Tobago Dictionary. Arima, Trinidad.
Solomon, Denis. The Speech of Trinidad: A Reference Grammar. Port-of-Spain: UWI School of Continuing Studies, 1993.
 James, Winford, 2001, Trinidad and Tobago Standard English?.
 James, Winford, 2003, Doing our own thing with English I.
 James, Winford, 2003, Doing our own thing with English II.
 James, Winford, 2004, What kind of question is this?.
 James, Winford, 2004, What kind of question is this? Pt2.

External links
 A Trinidadian accent
 Discussion of a paper by Lise Winer
 An Ethnolinguistic Study of the Trinidadian Creole community in Flatbush, Brooklyn by Keisha T. Lindsay and Justine Bolusi
 Frequently Asked Questions on Caribbean Language by the Society for Caribbean Linguistics
 Wiwords A cross-referencing dictionary of West Indian words with a large number of Trinidadian terms
The Sociolinguistic Situation of Trinidad and Tobago. 1997.
Phonological Hypercorrection in the Process of Decreolization--the Case of Trinidadian English.

Languages of Trinidad and Tobago
Caribbean English